Dongwuyuan (Beijing Zoo) Station is a station on the Line 4, of the Beijing Subway, located at the Beijing Zoo in Xicheng District, Beijing. The station on average has 100,000 entrances and exits per day.

Station layout
The station has an underground island platform.

Exits 
There are 5 exits, lettered A, B, C, D and E. Exit A is accessible.

See also
 Beijing Zoo

References

Railway stations in China opened in 2009
Beijing Subway stations in Xicheng District